Justin Joseph Thomas (born January 18, 1984) is an American former professional baseball pitcher. He played in Major League Baseball (MLB) for the Seattle Mariners, Pittsburgh Pirates, Boston Red Sox, and New York Yankees, in Nippon Professional Baseball (NPB) for the Hokkaido Nippon-Ham Fighters, in the Korea Baseball Organization (KBO) for the Kia Tigers, and in the Chinese Professional Baseball League (CPBL) for the Uni-President 7-Eleven Lions.

Amateur career

High school
Thomas attended Clay High School and Cardinal Stritch High School in Oregon, Ohio and was a four-year letterman for the varsity baseball team and set the school record for most home runs and tied the school record for most home runs in a season. Thomas was named to the USSSA World Series first-team all-tournament team and was a two-time first-team All-GLL selection. He was also named first-team all-district and was an honorable mention selection as a pitcher and helped lead Clay to a league championship. He was named team MVP and received the James F. O’Brian Award for Best Male Student Athlete. In addition to being a four-year letterman in baseball, he lettered in golf and was a three-year letter-winner in basketball.

College
Upon graduation, Thomas attended Youngstown State University from 2002 to 2005. The lefty starter helped the Penguins capture a Horizon League Title in the 2004, pitching the team into the finals and making their first ever appearance in the College World Series. In 2005, he was named First Team All-League and Horizon Pitcher of the Year boasting a 7-5 record with a 3.42 ERA and four complete games. He left Youngstown State ranked second in strikeouts with 250 and is the only pitcher in school history to pitch back-to-back seasons of at least seven wins.

College accolades
 2003 Second-team All-Horizon League 5-5 4.87 ERA 80 strikeouts
 2004 First-team All-Horizon League 7-3 5.11 ERA 4 CG 82 strikeouts
 2005 First-team All-Horizon League 7-5 3.42 ERA 4 CG 83 strikeouts
 2005 Horizon League Pitcher of the Year
 Three-time Horizon League pitcher of the week

Professional career

Seattle Mariners
Thomas was drafted by the Seattle Mariners as the 113th overall pick of the 2005 Major League Baseball Draft. After signing with Seattle in June of that year, Thomas made his professional debut for the Everett AquaSox of the short-season A affiliated Northwest League.

In , Thomas led all Mariners farmhands with 14 wins, finished second with 162 strikeouts and sixth with a 3.73 ERA. He was named the California League Pitcher of the Week in August and MiLB.com's Class-A Advanced Playoff Performer of the Year.

In , Thomas was promoted to Double-A West Tenn Diamond Jaxx, but began the season on the disabled list with a strained left elbow. Upon being activated from the DL, Thomas struggled with control problems, posting a 4-9 record with a 5.51 ERA and a career high 61 walks.

In , Thomas as he reduced his ERA with Double-A West Tenn to 4.32 and increased his strikeouts to walks ratio from 100 strikeouts/61 base on balls in '07 to 106 strikeouts/56 base on balls in '08. He was placed on the disabled list once again with a left hand laceration but came back to work out of the bullpen. Thomas received a mid-season call up to Triple-A Tacoma Rainiers posting a career low 3.71 ERA.

On September 1, 2008 the Seattle Mariners purchased Thomas' contract from Triple-A Tacoma. Thomas made his major league debut that day, taking on the Texas Rangers. In one inning of work, he gave up no runs, no hits, no walks, and struck out Marlon Byrd to end the game. Thomas pitched the rest of September with the Mariners, posting an 0-1 record and a 6.75 ERA.

In , Thomas was re-signed by the Seattle Mariners to a one-year contract and was placed on the 40-man roster.

Pittsburgh Pirates
On October 29, 2009, Thomas was claimed off waivers by the Pittsburgh Pirates.

In November, Thomas was designated for assignment.  He cleared waivers and was outrighted to Triple-A.

On June 24, 2010, he was called up from Triple-A to replace Dana Eveland, who was designated for assignment.
On September 11, 2010, he gave up a walk-off home run to Joey Votto of the Cincinnati Reds.

Thomas signed a minor league contract with an invitation to 2011 spring training with the Pirates.

Boston Red Sox
The Boston Red Sox signed Thomas to a minor league contract on November 22, 2011.  On April 4, 2012, the Red Sox selected Thomas' contract, adding him to their major league roster for their regular-season opener against the Detroit Tigers the following day. Thomas was optioned on April 27 to make room for Rich Hill, who had recovered from Tommy John surgery.

New York Yankees
On May 12, 2012, Thomas was claimed off waivers by the New York Yankees. On September 1, 2012, Thomas was called up from Triple-A when the major league rosters expanded. Thomas was designated for assignment on September 25, 2012.

Oakland Athletics
On November 21, 2012, Thomas signed a minor league deal with the Oakland Athletics that included an invitation to spring training. Thomas exercised an opt-out clause in his contract on July 1, 2013.

Hokkaido Nippon-Ham Fighters
On July 8, 2013, Thomas signed with the Hokkaido Nippon-Ham Fighters of Nippon Professional Baseball.

Los Angeles Angels of Anaheim
On January 5, 2014, Thomas signed a minor league deal with the Los Angeles Angels of Anaheim. He was assigned to the Salt Lake Bees to begin the season. On July 25, 2014, Thomas was released.

Kia Tigers
Thomas signed with the Kia Tigers of the Korea Baseball Organization after his release from the Angels. He pitched to a 4.44 ERA with 51 strikeouts in 46.2 innings with the team. On December 27, 2014, Thomas was released.

Uni-President 7-Eleven Lions
Thomas signed with the Uni-President 7-Eleven Lions of the Chinese Professional Baseball League for the 2015 season.

References

External links

, or Korea Baseball Organization

1984 births
Living people
American expatriate baseball players in Japan
American expatriate baseball players in South Korea
American expatriate baseball players in Taiwan
Baseball players from Ohio
Boston Red Sox players
Bravos de Margarita players
Cardenales de Lara players
Everett AquaSox players
Hokkaido Nippon-Ham Fighters players
Indianapolis Indians players
Inland Empire 66ers of San Bernardino players
KBO League pitchers
Kia Tigers players
Leones del Caracas players
American expatriate baseball players in Venezuela
Major League Baseball pitchers
New York Yankees players
Pawtucket Red Sox players
Peoria Javelinas players
Pittsburgh Pirates players
Sacramento River Cats players
Salt Lake Bees players
Scranton/Wilkes-Barre Yankees players
Seattle Mariners players
Tacoma Rainiers players
Uni-President 7-Eleven Lions players
West Tennessee Diamond Jaxx players
Wisconsin Timber Rattlers players
Youngstown State Penguins baseball players
Sportspeople from Toledo, Ohio